Eriorhynchus hades is a species in the genus Eriorhynchus.

References

Trombidiformes
Animals described in 1997